Iberville is a former provincial electoral division in Manitoba, Canada. It was created by redistribution in 1914, and was eliminated by the 1955 redistribution before the 1958 provincial election.

Iberville was located to the west of Winnipeg, the capital city of Manitoba. When it was eliminated in 1958, some of its territory was transferred to the new constituency of Rockwood—Iberville, some to the new district of Fort Garry, and some to newly-drawn Assiniboia.

Provincial representatives

Electoral results

1914 general election

1915 general election

1917 by-election

1920 general election

1922 general election

1927 general election

1932 general election

1936 general election

1941 general election

1945 general election

1949 general election

1953 general election

1958 general election

1959 general election

1962 general election

1966 general election 

Former provincial electoral districts of Manitoba